Darrow is an unincorporated community and census-designated place in Ascension Parish, Louisiana, United States. It was first listed as a CDP in the 2020 census with a population of 200. 

It is the location of three properties listed on the U.S. National Register of Historic Places: Bocage, Helvetia Dependency, and Hermitage plantations. Darrow also is the home to the childhood house of James Carville after it was moved down the Mississippi River from Carville, Louisiana.

Demographics

Note: the US Census treats Hispanic/Latino as an ethnic category. This table excludes Latinos from the racial categories and assigns them to a separate category. Hispanics/Latinos can be of any race.

Notable people
Edward Joseph Price, state representative for District 58, former resident of Darrow

References

Baton Rouge metropolitan area
Census-designated places in Ascension Parish, Louisiana
Unincorporated communities in Ascension Parish, Louisiana